Sacred Games is an Indian neo-noir crime thriller streaming television series based on Vikram Chandra's 2006  novel of the same name. India's first Netflix original series, it was produced and directed by Vikramaditya Motwane and Anurag Kashyap as Phantom Films. The novel was adapted by Varun Grover, Smita Singh, and Vasant Nath. Kelly Luegenbiehl, Erik Barmack and Motwane were the series' executive producers.

Sartaj Singh (Saif Ali Khan) is a troubled police officer in Mumbai who receives a phone call from gangster Ganesh Gaitonde (Nawazuddin Siddiqui), who tells him to save the city within 25 days; the series chronicles the events which follow. Other cast members include Radhika Apte, Girish Kulkarni, Neeraj Kabi, Jeetendra Joshi, Rajshri Deshpande, Karan Wahi, Sukhmani Sadana, Aamir Bashir, Jatin Sarna, Elnaaz Norouzi, Pankaj Tripathi, Amey Wagh, Kubbra Sait, Surveen Chawla, Kalki Koechlin, Ranvir Shorey and Amruta Subhash.

Sacred Games began development after Netflix vice-president Erik Barmack asked Motwane in 2014 to create Indian content for the platform. They decided to adapt Chandra's novel in Hindi. After a script was completed, Motwane asked Kashyap to co-direct; Motwane directed the scenes with Singh, and Kashyap directed Gaitonde's scenes. Swapnil Sonawane was director of photography for Motwane; Sylvester Fonseca and Aseem Bajaj filmed the scenes directed by Kashyap. In the second season, Motwane reduced his involvement to showrunner and was replaced as director by Neeraj Ghaywan. Aarti Bajaj was the editor, and Alokananda Dasgupta composed the background score.

The first season of Sacred Games consisting of eight episodes was released on Netflix on 5 July 2018 in 191 countries. The series is subtitled in over 20 languages. It received mostly positive reviews from critics, with particular praise for its performances and writing. The first season is the only Indian series to appear on The New York Times "The 30 Best International TV Shows of the Decade" list. The second season premiered on 15 August 2019, met with a mixed response making the producers reconsider a third season. Siddiqui has said that there will not be a third season; the show had an open-ended climax.

Overview 
Sartaj Singh is a troubled Mumbai Police inspector who seeks validation from a police force he hates for its corruption. He receives a phone call from Ganesh Gaitonde, a notorious crime lord who has been missing for 16 years. He tells Sartaj to save the city in 25 days, beginning a chain of events that burrows deep into India's underworld. On his journey, Sartaj is helped by Research and Analysis Wing (RAW) officer Anjali Mathur; flashbacks detail Gaitonde's origins, and how he became Mumbai's crime lord. The first season follows Sartaj as he tries to uncover clues about Gaitonde's past and learns about a connection between Gaitonde and his father.

In season two, Gaitonde's story continues in flashbacks while Sartaj tries to find answers. Sartaj discovers an ashram to which his father once belonged, and learns about their apocalyptic plans to create a new, conflict-free world. Gaitonde's meeting with Khanna Guruji, how he became part of the ashram, and his activities with them are depicted in flashbacks. Also explored is how Gaitonde was deployed in Kenya by Kusum Devi Yadava RAW officer who tries to keep Gaitonde's archenemy Suleiman Isa alive so she can capture and kill Shahid Khan, a dangerous extremist who turns out to be Sartaj's cousin and harbors a plan (with the ashram) to wipe out India.

Cast

Episodes

Production

Development
Netflix vice-president Erik Barmack came across Sacred Games, Vikram Chandra's 2006 crime novel, while the service was searching for Indian content for a global audience. Barmack called it "an interesting property", and decided to adapt it in Hindi. In 2014, Netflix approached Phantom Films to produce a series; writer-director Vikramaditya Motwane met their team during a visit to Los Angeles. Motwane had read Chandra's earlier novel, Love and Longing in Bombay, which introduces the character of Sartaj Singh. After the meeting, he read Sacred Games and thought it was "great". Motwane said that the best thing for him was that Netflix wanted to produce the series in Hindi, rather than English: "Speaking in English can seem so fake at times." He started working on the adaptation with writer Varun Grover, calling the writing process the "biggest challenge".

Motwane found the web-series medium "liberating", since he could tell stories which "don't have to be told in two-and-a-half hours with an interval and three songs inserted into it." Although he initially considered using different directors for each episode, "As we got closer to production, we realised that dates were clashing and that it was an overall nightmare [...]" Motwane suggested that he and Anurag Kashyap co-direct the series, since he felt that the two "distinct voices" were essential for the two parallel tracks of the plot. Kashyap said that he "gobbled" up the opportunity as the novel had fascinated him. In 2014, he was approached by AMC and Scott Free Productions to direct an English-language adaptation of the novel. Kashyap declined, since he did not want to do "anything based in India in English". Motwane and his writers gave the scripts to Chandra for feedback: "Chandra is so research-intensive that we didn't have to approach another researcher, we just had to ask him questions." The series was written by Grover, Smita Singh, and Vasant Nath. Singh said that in 2016, they were told by Phantom Films that "it had to be a gripping slow-burner". Research was directed by Smita Nair and Mantra Watsa, who summarised every chapter and made the "complex plot easily accessible" to the writers. The series' script was completed in a year. Nath said that in the beginning of the writing process, they were "chucking away some important characters from the original, and bringing in new ones". Sacred Games is Netflix' first Indian original series.

Its episode titles were inspired by Hindu mythology. The first episode, "Aswatthama", was based on the namesake character from the Mahabharata who was cursed with immortality by Krishna after the Kurukshetra War. In the series, Gaitonde calls himself immortal (like Ashwatthama) before he commits suicide. "Halahala", the second episode, was named after a poison created from the churning of the sea. Aatapi and Vatapi were two demons who tricked people with their nice behavior and killed them. Brahmahatya (the killing of a brahmin) is a crime in Hinduism. In that episode, the Hindu Gaitonde agrees to attract Muslim votes for the Hindu politician Bhosale. "Sarama" refers to as a dog. "Pretakalpa" refers to a Hindu text read at a funeral. In this episode, Katekar is killed and Sartaj cremates him. Rudra is the angry version of Shiva. Gaitonde's wife Subhadra is killed in this episode, and he takes revenge by murdering her killers. Yayati was a king who was cursed with premature old age. The series' title sequence, logo, and title designs were designed by graphic designer Aniruddh Mehta and the Mumbai-based motion lab Plexus, who were inspired by Hindu mythology. Mehta said that each emblem was a contemporary take on "stories from ancient Hindu scriptures, mandalas, mixing modern design elements with characters from the Indus Valley Civilization". The sequence also featured real footages of several events such as the demolition of the Babri Masjid.

Several changes were made in adapting the novel as a series. Kukoo, a transgender woman, is mentioned in passing in the novel as a dancer with whom a police officer fell in love; a constable describes Kukoo to Sartaj as "beautiful as a Kashmiri apple". In the series, Kukoo is a prominent character as Gaitonde's love interest; Malcolm Murad, mentioned once in the novel, has a prominent role in the series as an assassin. A few other changes were made in the adaptation. The Bombay riots are prominent in the novel; in the series, they are briefly described by Gaitonde.

Casting and characters

Several characters in the series speak different Indian languages (Hindi, Marathi, Punjabi and Gujarati), and Kashyap cited that as giving a "real sense of what India is". Saif Ali Khan, who plays the cop Sartaj Singh, called the series an experiment, and said he agreed to do it because "people are willing to watch programmes from other countries with sub-titles because good stories transcend boundaries." Khan found an "interesting arc" in Singh, calling the character "troubled and honest". He said that he read portions of the novel, but stopped when he found that it was not helping him find what he needed as an actor. Radhika Apte played Research and Analysis Wing (RAW) officer Anjali Mathur. Apte called her character a "completely no-nonsense, focused woman who's highly respected in her field and by her peers." She said that her character was not glamourised (unlike Hindi film depictions of a RAW agent). Kashyap said that the novel is about "how Bombay became Mumbai", and the series gives "a sense of the city, where it came from and where it is today."

Nawazuddin Siddiqui said that he treated his role as a gangster like a human being. Siddiqui felt that a series provides more time for character exploration than a film, and wanted to try the format. He called Gaitonde the most complex character he had played to date. Khan read Chandra's short story, "Kama", to "delve into his character's angst." Sartaj Singh's appearance was changed from tall and thin in the novel to muscular and heavier in the series. According to Khan, the change was made to make the character look "visually engaging" and a "slightly more charged-up version of the passive officer in the books". Kashyap called Gaitonde the "sum of all we like in movie characters." Motwane said that Siddiqui was his first choice to play Gaitonde because he "plays gangster so well" and "has that aura and almost everything that's required to play a gangster." He said that casting popular actors like Khan and Siddiqui "drives a larger audience to watch." He said that it was easier to convince Apte and Neeraj Kabi for the roles after Khan and Siddiqui were cast. Kabi was cast as DCP Parulkar, whom he researched in the novel. He also worked on the superintendent's body language, which was noted in the novel. Jitendra Joshi played Constable Ashok Katekar, Sartaj's colleague, after auditioning for the role. He was inspired by real-life police officers for his portrayal.

Actress Kubbra Sait played Kukoo, a transgender woman. She was asked to audition by Kashyap at the screening of Mukkabaaz at the MAMI Film Festival, and was cast. Sait felt that the lack of any reference for Kukoo's role made it "the most challenging experience" of her career; she wore a prosthetic penis. Jatin Sarna was cast as gangster Deepak "Bunty" Shinde after auditioning. Rajshri Deshpande played Gaitonde's wife, Subhadra. Girish Kulkarni was originally offered the role of Katekar; he declined because he wanted a character "that would figure in both Sartaj and Ganesh Gaitonde's world", and was then cast as minister Bipin Bhosale. Iranian actress Elnaaz Norouzi was cast as film star Zoya Mirza. Production design was by Shazia Iqbal and Vintee Bansal, and Aarti Bajaj edited the series. Swapnil Sonawane filmed the portions directed by Motwane, and Sylvester Fonseca and Aseem Bajaj shot Kashyap's scenes. Anish John was the series' sound designer.

Filming

Season 1
Motwane began filming in September 2017. Kashyap started filming after the Mukkabaaz (2017) was completed, and finished shooting in January 2018. Motwane and Kashyap filmed separately; Motwane directed the present-day scenes with Khan, and Kashyap filmed 1980s Bombay with Siddiqui. Motwane called the separate filming an "experiment", and Kashyap found it "painfully difficult" to find "pockets of Bombay which has kept itself like it is". Chandra was working on the novel while Kashyap was working on his film, Black Friday (2007), and he "knew the real-life parallels" in the novel. Kashyap said that he shot the series as he would a film. Motwane said that except for omitting small details, they "stuck to the spirit of the book". He tried to balance the series, "making it for a worldwide audience [and not alienating] everybody over here." Motwane said that he enjoyed telling a story without being confined to a three-act structure. Chandra served as a script consultant in the series.

Sacred Games was shot in several Mumbai locations, including the Byculla neighbourhood, and Motwane said that its period setting presented a "huge logistical challenge". Although the time period of Gaitonde's story remained unchanged, the present-day narrative was shifted to the present from the early 2000s. Motwane said that there is a "similar sort of government [today] and the vibes are the same, so the threat felt a lot more present". According to Sonawane, "A lot of changes happened on the shoot". Several shots in the script, such as the introduction of Gaitonde as a child, were top-angle shots. He filmed Sartaj Singh's scenes with "worn-out but very warm lenses that reflect how nothing is working out in Sartaj's life." The color yellow was used in Gaitonde's scenes to signify that the "guru that he has begun to follow." Bajaj shot for 27 days, leaving when he became involved in another project; Fonseca shot the remaining scenes, using spherical lenses to "demarcate" the world. The shootout at Gaitonde's house was filmed at three locations, with long takes on Steadicam and hand-held cameras. A scene with Sait, involving frontal nudity, was filmed in seven takes.

Season 2
In September 2018, it was announced that the series had been renewed for a second season. A 58-second teaser promoting the season premiered on 21 September. Kashyap continued to direct, and Neeraj Ghaywan replaced Motwane as co-director. Pankaj Tripathi and Surveen Chawla, seen briefly during the first season, returned in larger roles. Kalki Koechlin, Ranvir Shorey and Amruta Subhash joined the series, and Chawla filmed while she was pregnant. Shooting began in November 2018, with Siddiqui filming his scenes in Nairobi and Khan filming his in Mumbai. It was shot on a 50-day schedule, Ghaywan filming with Khan. The season was extensively filmed in Mombasa, Cape Town and Johannesburg. Shooting ended on 19 February 2019, and the season premiered on 15 August of that year. In 2020, Siddiqui said that there might not be a third season.

Music

Release

Sacred Games is the first Netflix original series from India. The service announced three new series and four others in February 2018, for a total of seven Indian series in production. A preview of the main three characters (Sartaj, Gaitonde and Anjali Mathur) was released by Netflix on 23 February 2018, with photos of a blood-spattered Sartaj, a perplexed-looking Mathur and a pyjama-clad Gaitonde. A 45-second teaser video was released on 3 May, followed by a trailer on 6 June. The series' first four episodes premiered in Mumbai on 29 June 2018 at the MAMI film festival. Netflix released the series on 5 July in 191 countries, subtitled in over 20 languages. Related mashup videos, artwork and memes circulated on social media after the series' release.

On 10 July 2018, Indian National Congress member Rajeev Kumar Sinha filed a first information report against Netflix, the showrunners and Nawazuddin Siddiqui for allegedly insulting former Indian Prime Minister Rajiv Gandhi in one scene. Another complaint was lodged the following day by Youth Indian National Trade Union Congress city wing and All Indian Cine Worker's Association president (and Congress Party activist) Suresh Shyamal Gupta for allegedly insulting Gandhi. On 14 July 2018, Rahul Gandhi tweeted that freedom "is a fundamental democratic right. My father lived and died in the service of India. The views of a character on a fictional web series can never change that." The following day, Sinha withdrew his complaint after Gandhi's tweet. Netflix announced on 19 July that the English subtitle had been changed to remove the alleged insult to Gandhi. According to Netflix vice-president Todd Yellin, its first season was watched by twice as many people outside India.

Reception

Critical response
The series received positive reviews from critics, who praised its performances. On Rotten Tomatoes, season 1 has an approval rating of 92% based on reviews from 26 critics. On Rotten Tomatoes, season 2 has an approval rating of 60% based on reviews from 5 critics.

According to Raja Sen, "It is not an immediately explosive concept, unfolding more like a thriller by numbers, helped along by strong performances and some nimble direction." Jai Arjun Singh said that Sacred Games replicated the novel's profanity, and the "series uses its own methods to stress the idea of religion as something that can be both nurturing and cannibalistic". Ektaa Malik of The Indian Express called the series "edgier and more layered": "For those who have read the original source material — the novel Sacred Games — they might find the series a bit jarring with regards to certain plot developments." Manjusha Radhakrishnan of Gulf News called it an "edgy, thrilling winner", with Khan and Siddiqui in "top form". Saibal Chatterjee of NDTV gave it a positive review: "The series has the potential to wean back viewers who have been driven away from television by drab soap operas and trite entertainment formats."

Dipti Kharude of The Quint praised the series' writing: "What's commendable is that Sacred Games chooses compassion over glorification." Swetha Ramakrishnan of Firstpost called it a "high benchmark for India's first Netflix original", and the show provided "due diligence with high production value and an investment into the right parameterswriting, acting and direction." According to Shristi Negi of News18, the series "totally grips you from start to finish". Ankur Pathak of HuffPost also gave it a positive review: "At the surface, Sacred Games appears to be a standard cat-and-mouse chase but the show's probing, introspective nature turns a clichéd crime-saga to a biting commentary on the zeitgeist. Its relevance to our current moment cannot be overstated."

Tim Goodman of The Hollywood Reporter wrote that "there are clear flaws", but "there's something riveting about India's bleaker, darker heart being exposed as opposed to some upbeat, colorful explosion of dance scenes". Mike Hale of The New York Times was less enthusiastic: "Despite its verve and visual inventiveness, the series feels muddled and a little wearying at times". Adam Starkey of Metro, however, wrote that the dual narratives are occasionally jarring but compelling nonetheless. Taylor Antrim called the series "mesmerizing" and "addictive": "Bollywood maximal-ism meets downbeat Euro noir meets Hollywood gangster epic". Steve Greene of IndieWire called the series a "surface-level telling of a story that wants to have so much more in its grasp" and noted its violence. John Doyle of The Globe and Mail wrote that the series "sprawls from thriller to dense character study to brooding meditation on the roots of India's political corruption." However, some elements of the story "will puzzle viewers not familiar with India's tangled religious tensions and caste system." Kaitlin Reily of Refinery29 called Sacred Games a "juicy crime thriller that combines a hard-boiled detective story with magical realism." Lincoln Michel of GQ called it the "best Netflix original in years."

The second season received less-favorable reviews than the first, with Tanul Thakur of The Wire writing that it "severely lacks the urgency, the wicked humour and the heartfelt bonds that made the first season so captivating." According to Shreya Iyer of The Times of India, the series "falls short on several levels and is unable to live up to the hype created by the previous season." Kaushani Banerjee of The New Indian Express wrote, "There seems to be a lack of effort or failure to bring newness to the characters which became iconic after the first season was aired." Soumya Rao of Scroll.in called the season "too ambitious for its own good".

Accolades
Sacred Games received the Best Drama Award at the News18 iReel Awards. It received five awards from 11 nominations, including Best Actor (Drama) for Nawazuddin Siddiqui, Best Supporting Actor for Jitendra Joshi, Best Writing (Drama), Best Ensemble Cast, and Best Series (Drama). Kashyap received the Best Direction (Fiction) Award and Aarti Bajaj received the Award for Best Editing at the inaugural Asian Academy Creative Awards. It received the Best Show Jury (Web) and Best Supporting Actor (Web) Award for Kabi, at the 18th Indian Television Academy Awards. The second season was nominated for a 2019 Best Drama International Emmy Award. Sait garnered the OTT Best Female Actor in Negative Role Award at the 2019 Gold Awards. Alokananda Dasgupta received the Best Background Music Award while Slyvester Fonseca received the Best Cinematographer Award at the 2020 Filmfare OTT Awards. It is the only Indian series on The New York Times "30 Best International TV Shows of the Decade" list.

References

External links
 
 

Hindi-language Netflix original programming
2018 Indian television series debuts
Indian drama television series
Television shows set in Mumbai
Research and Analysis Wing in fiction
Indian crime television series
Fictional portrayals of the Maharashtra Police
Television series about organized crime
Television shows based on Indian novels
Indian period television series
Indian LGBT-related television shows
Indian television series distributed by Netflix
Cultural depictions of Indira Gandhi
Transgender-related television shows
Bollywood in fiction
Indian political television series
Cultural depictions of Rajiv Gandhi
Indian crime drama television series
Thriller television series
Mystery television series
Television shows set in Kenya
Television series about cults
Sikhism in fiction
Works about organised crime in India
Television series about nuclear war and weapons
India–Pakistan relations in popular culture